Jiuyue may refer to:

Jiǔyuè,  ninth month of the year or tenth month of the specific year in the Chinese calendar
September (1984 film), Chinese film directed by Tian Zhuangzhuang